Ithome is a mountain in Messenia, a regional unit of Greece

Other locations
 Ithomi (disambiguation), two places in Greece
 Ithome (Thessaly), a town of ancient Thessaly, Greece
 Ithome, the ancient settlement over which Epaminondas built Ancient Messene

Science
 Ithome (moth), a genus of moths
 ithome, a species of Appias (genus)

Other
Ithome (mythology)